Robert Getchell (December 6, 1936 –  October 21, 2017) was an American screenwriter. Getchell wrote the 1974 film Alice Doesn't Live Here Anymore and created the sitcom based on that film, Alice. Getchell was also the screenwriter for the 1981  docudrama film Mommie Dearest which is based on Christina Crawford's nightmarish childhood with her violent and manipulative alcoholic adoptive mother, the actress Joan Crawford. The film was meant to be taken seriously with a subject concerning child abuse/trafficking however, Getchell's unusual script became over-the-top and unintentionally amusing that it won the 2nd Golden Raspberry award for worst Screenplay which developed Mommie Dearest into a memorable cult film.

He died on 21 October 2017 aged 80.

Filmography
 Alice Doesn't Live Here Anymore (1974)
 Bound for Glory (1976)
 Alice (1976–1985)
 Mommie Dearest (1981)
 Sweet Dreams (1985)
 Stella (1990)
 Point of No Return (1993)
 This Boy's Life (1993)
 The Client (1994)

Awards
 1975: nominated for an Academy Award and Writers Guild of America Award for Alice Doesn't Live Here Anymore.
 1976: won a BAFTA Award for Alice Doesn't Live Here Anymore.
 1977: nominated for an Academy Award and WGA Award for Bound for Glory.
 1982: won a Golden Raspberry Award for Worst Screenplay for Mommie Dearest.

References

Further reading
Putt, Jr., Barry M. (2019). Alice: Life Behind the Counter in Mel's Greasy Spoon (A Guide to the Feature Film, the TV Series, and More). Albany, Georgia: BearManor Media. .

External links
 

1936 births
2017 deaths
American male screenwriters
Best Screenplay BAFTA Award winners
People from Kansas City, Missouri